The William J. Fischer Housing Development, better known as the Fischer Projects, was a housing project in Algiers, New Orleans, Louisiana, United States. It was known notoriously for a series of high-profile murders in the 1970s and 1980s. It was also the last conventional public housing development constructed in New Orleans and originally consisted of a 13-floor high-rise and fourteen 3-floor units.  The area has been undergoing redevelopment since about 2004 and currently none of the original low-rise buildings remain.  The development is located along Whitney Avenue in the Algiers area of the city's west bank, which is part of the 15th Ward and is named for William J. Fischer who served as chairman of HANO in the 1950s. The property is now converted to a small low-income housing development.

History
The development was isolated from other West Bank communities by the bridge, the Donner Canal and a Southern Pacific Railroad line. The 14 low-rise buildings were built in long parallel lines and positioned using the scattered site method resulting in large park areas covering approximately 60% of the  site. A 13-story high-rise building was constructed in 1966 and served as housing for the elderly. Upon completion of the high-rise, the development had a total of 1002 units. The development also included Murray Henderson Elementary School, constructed in 1965 and William J. Fischer Elementary School which opened in 1967. Over the years, the development became rundown and saw a rise in violent crime similar to other public housing developments in New Orleans and around the country. The Fischer Projects made national headlines in the news in 1980 when a police officer was murdered. In retaliation of the murdered officer, four black men were killed in a raid by officers.

Crime problems
The Fischer housing projects has been notorious for violence since the 1970s. In the early 1980s police brutality between the New Orleans Police Department and Fischer residents grew to concern after police officer Gregory Neupert was killed by a sniper while patrolling the project at night. The violent police response to Neupert's killing led to the federal indictment of seven officers. They would be known as the "Algiers 7." After the officers indictment, policemen were afraid to enter back into the project in fear of being killed. A sniper set uptop the Fischer high-rise building and regularly fired at police passing.

In May 1989 a gunman sprayed a crowd with bullets in a courtyard in the Fischer killing a man and wounding 4 others.
The next month a veteran police officer who was on a stakeout in the project, narrowly escaped serious injury when a gunman riddled the officer's van with bullets, police said. Officer Gary Dewey, was showered with broken glass and possible metal fragments at 9:38 p.m. in what appeared to be an attempt to kill him. Crime was so ferocious in the Fischer to where The Regional Transit Authority had to discontinue nighttime service through Fischer and along Whitney Avenue after several buses were shot at or had bricks and rocks thrown at them. 
In May 1991 one person was killed and five were wounded in a shooting spree in the project. The shootings had occurred a couple hundred yards from Fischer Elementary School.
The most famous murders of the Fischer Projects were the murders of nursing student Jo Ellen Smith, Claudette McGowan and her eight-year-old child, and the murder of Officer Gregory Neupert.

1990 crime crackdown
In the summer of 1990 the police arrested 18 people and seized two machine guns as part of a crackdown on crime in the Fischer housing project. Police beefed up patrols in the project since the end of August 1990 to curtail drug dealing and violence. Marked and unmarked patrol cars spent eight to nine hours twice weekly in the 1,500-unit complex instead of the occasional drive-through they use to do the monitor drug dealing.

JoEllen Smith murder
On Wednesday April 10, 1973 the body of twenty-two year old nursing student, JoEllen Smith, was found near the Fischer Projects, between Atlantic and Socrates Streets. She had been missing since Sunday April 8, 1973. Police found her she had suffered from four gun shot wounds to the head; it also appeared that she had been sexually assaulted. She had entered the community because she had been instructed to aid an elderly patient living within the Fischer Homes. Two men were charged with the murder of JoEllen, Steven Berry and Timothy Rudolph, both who had violent arrest records prior to this particular case. In light of her murder, her father set up a foundation called the JoEllen Smith Foundation that aided the community, and a hospital was constructed and built in remembrance of her life, called the JoEllen Smith Memorial Hospital.  The hospital was demolished in 2016.

Murder of Officer Gregory Neupert
On November 9, 1980 Gregory Neupert, a white police officer, was shot and killed making his rounds near Fischer Projects. His body was found in ditch the next day. The death of this police officer sparked a huge controversy and lead to the raid of the Fischer projects by the New Orleans Police Department. Four people were killed due to the raid and black community members became enraged, claiming that the New Orleans Police Department was out of control and that their raids had become brutal. Later these officers would be remembered as the Algiers 7. The police officers in the Algiers community were enraged, some were in search of redemption for Officer Neupert, other for redemption of the slain people caught in the cross fires laced in anger in the raid. The murder of Officer Gregory Neupert and the four people murdered by the police resulted in a civil rights protest against the New Orleans Police Department, citing racism and police brutality.

Claudia McGown & Leslie McGown murders
During the night of August 25, 1987, three children were hurled out of a window from a third story apartment building in the Fischer Projects, resulting in the death of an eight-year-old girl. Claudia McGown, had been stabbed to death right before her three children were thrown from the window. The man accused and convicted of the murders was William J. Brown, the boyfriend of McGown, who had been intoxicated by a drug called “clickum Juice,” a drug later known as PCP. According to the papers the use of “clickum Juice” and heroin were widespread in the Fischer community. Brown was arrested shortly after and charged with two counts of murder and two counts of attempted murder.

Redeveloped into low-income housing
Starting in the early 2000s, HANO began planning a redevelopment of the complex. Additionally, the plans included a new community for elderly residents, a community center and playgrounds.

The Fischer high-rise was imploded on January 25, 2004, drawing large crowds as New Orleans' first demolition by implosion.   Replacing the highrise were numerous low-income houses.

Demolition of the last three low-rise buildings began in January 2008 as part of a $1.2 million project to remove the vacant buildings and construct the infrastructure necessary for redeveloping the area.  Plans for this stage of redevelopment call for construction of approximately 70 homes and 26 rental units, most of which are intended for public housing and Section 8 residents.

Demographics
As of the census of 2000, there were 2,034 people, 506 households, and 425 families residing in the neighborhood.

As of the census of 2010, there were 849 people, 269 households, and 171 families residing in the neighborhood.

See also
 Housing Authority of New Orleans

References

External links
 Housing Authority of New Orleans, Fischer Homes

Neighborhoods in New Orleans
Public housing in New Orleans